The 2018 Winter Olympics torch relay was run from October 24, 2017, until February 9, 2018, in advance of the 2018 Winter Olympics. After being lit in Olympia, Greece, the torch traveled to Athens on 31 October. The torch began its Korean journey on 1 November, visiting all regions of Korea. The Korean leg began in Incheon International Airport: the torch travelled across the country for 101 days. 7,500 relay runners participated in the torch relay over a distance of 2,018 km. The torchbearers each carried the flame for 200 metres. The relay ended in Pyeongchang's Olympic Stadium, the main venue of the 2018 Olympics. The final torch was lit by figure skater Yuna Kim.

Route in Greece

October 24
 Olympia

October 25
 Pyrgos
 Amaliada
 Kalavryta
 Patras

October 26
 Rio
 Antirio
 Missolonghi
 Agrinio
 Arta
 Ioannina

October 27
 Grevena
 Kozani
 Kastoria

October 28
 Florina
 Edessa
 Giannitsa
 Thessaloniki

October 29
 Kilkis
 Rodopoli
 Sidirokastro
 Serres
 Drama
 Naousa

October 30
 Veria
 Katerini
 Litochoro
 Larissa
 Delphi

October 31
 Arachova
 Livadeia
 Eleusis
 Athens
 Panathenaic Stadium

Route in South Korea

References

External links

 Official website 

Torch Relay, 2018 Winter Olympics
Olympic torch relays